Longicella is a genus of moths of the family Noctuidae. The genus was erected by Karl Jordan in 1896.

Species
 Longicella luctifera Boisduval, 1836
 Longicella mollis Walker, 1856
 Longicella mollis decipiens Butler, 1884
 Longicella mollis detanii Kishida, 1993
 Longicella mollis mollis Walker, 1856

References

 Kishida, Y. (1993). "The agaristine moths of south east Asia (3), Description of three new forms of Longicella, Cruriopsis and Mimeusemia (Noctuidae: Agaristinae)". Gekkan-Mushi. (269): 12-13.

Agaristinae